The 1922–23 Fall River F.C. season was the first season for the club after the Fall River United franchise was purchased and relaunched by Sam Mark. The club continued to play in the American Soccer League and finished the season in 3rd place.

American Soccer League

Pld = Matches played; W = Matches won; D = Matches drawn; L = Matches lost; GF = Goals for; GA = Goals against; Pts = Points

National Challenge Cup

Notes and references
Bibliography

Footnotes

Fall River F.C.
American Soccer League (1921–1933) seasons
Fall River F.C.